The minimum railway curve radius is the shortest allowable design radius for the centerline of railway tracks under a particular set of conditions. It has an important bearing on construction costs and operating costs and, in combination with superelevation (difference in elevation of the two rails) in the case of train tracks, determines the maximum safe speed of a curve. The minimum radius of a curve is one parameter in the design of railway vehicles as well as trams; monorails and automated guideways are also subject to a minimum radius.

History 
The first proper railway was the Liverpool and Manchester Railway, which opened in 1830.  Like the tram roads that had preceded it over a hundred years, the L&M had gentle curves and gradients. Reasons for these gentle curves include the lack of strength of the track, which might have overturned if the curves were too sharp causing derailments. The gentler the curves, the greater the visibility, thus boosting safety via increased situational awareness. The earliest rails were made in short lengths of wrought iron, which does not bend like later steel rails introduced in the 1850s.

Factors affecting the minimum curve radius 

Minimum curve radii for railways are governed by the speed operated and by the mechanical ability of the rolling stock to adjust to the curvature.  In North America, equipment for unlimited interchange between railway companies is built to accommodate for a   radius, but normally a  radius is used as a minimum, as some freight carriages (freight cars) are handled by special agreement between railways that cannot take the sharper curvature. For the handling of long freight trains, a minimum  radius is preferred.

The sharpest curves tend to be on the narrowest of narrow gauge railways, where almost all the equipment is proportionately smaller. But standard gauge can also have tight curves, if rolling stocks are built for it, which however removes the standardisation benefit of standard gauge. Tramways can have below  curve radius.

Steam locomotives 
As the need for more powerful steam locomotives grew, the need for more driving wheels on a longer, fixed wheelbase grew too. But long wheel bases do not cope well with curves of a small radius. Various types of articulated locomotives (e.g., Mallet, Garratt, and Shay) were devised to avoid having to operate multiple locomotives with multiple crews.

More recent diesel and electric locomotives do not have a wheelbase problem, as they have flexible bogies, and also can easily be operated in multiple with a single crew.

The Tasmanian Government Railways K class was
 gauge
 radius curves
Example Garratt
 
 rails
Main line radius - 
Siding radius -  
0-4-0
GER Class 209

Couplings 
Not all couplers can handle very short radii. This is particularly true of the European buffer and chain couplers, where the buffers extend the length of the rail car body. As narrow-gauge railways, tramways, and rapid transit systems normally do not interchange with mainline railways, instances of these types of railway in Europe often use bufferless central couplers and build to a tighter standard.

Train lengths 
A long heavy freight train, especially those with wagons of mixed loading, may struggle on short radius curves, as the drawgear forces may pull intermediate wagons off the rails.  Common solutions include:
 marshaling light and empty wagons at the rear of the train
 intermediate locomotives, including remotely controlled ones
 easing curves
 reduced speeds
 reduced cant (superelevation), at the expense of fast passenger trains
 more, shorter trains
 equalizing wagon loading (often employed on unit trains) 
 better driver training
 driving controls that display drawgear forces
Electronically Controlled Pneumatic brakes

A similar problem occurs with harsh changes in gradients (vertical curves).

Speed and cant
As a heavy train goes around a bend at speed, the centripetal force may cause negative effects: passengers and cargo may experience unpleasant forces, the inside and outside rails will wear unequally, and insufficiently anchored tracks may move.  To counter this, a cant (superelevation) is used.  Ideally, the train should be tilted such that resultant force acts vertically downwards through the bottom of the train, so the wheels, track, train and passengers  feel little or no sideways force ("down" and "sideways" are given with respect to the plane of the track and train). Some trains are capable of tilting to enhance this effect for passenger comfort. Because freight and passenger trains tend to move at different speeds, a cant cannot be ideal for both types of rail traffic.

The relationship between speed and tilt can be calculated mathematically. We start with the formula for a balancing centripetal force: θ is the angle by which the train is tilted due to the cant, r is the curve radius in meters, v is the speed in meters per second, and g is the standard gravity, approximately equal to 9.81 m/s²:

Rearranging for r gives:

Geometrically, tan θ can be expressed (using the Small-angle approximation) in terms of the track gauge G, the cant ha and cant deficiency hb, all in millimeters:

This approximation for tan θ gives:

This table shows examples of curve radii. The values used when building high-speed railways vary, and depend on desired wear and safety levels.

Tramways typically do not exhibit cant, due to the low speeds involved.  Instead, they use the outer grooves of rails as a guide in tight curves.

Transition curves 

A curve should not become a straight all at once, but should gradually increase in radius over time (a distance of around 40m-80m for a line with a maximum speed of about 100 km/h). Even worse than curves with no transition are reverse curves with no intervening straight track. The superelevation must also be transitioned. Higher speeds require longer transitions.

Vertical curves 

As a train negotiates a curve, the force it exerts on the track changes. Too tight a 'crest' curve could result in the train leaving the track as it drops away beneath it; too tight a 'trough' and the train will plough downwards into the rails and damage them. More precisely, the support force R exerted by the track on a train as a function of the curve radius r, the train mass , and the speed , is given by

with the second term positive for troughs, negative for crests.  For passenger comfort the ratio of the gravitational acceleration g to the centripetal acceleration v2/r needs to be kept as small as possible, else passengers will feel large changes in their weight.

As trains cannot climb steep slopes, they have little occasion to go over significant vertical curves. However, high-speed trains are sufficiently high-powered that steep slopes are preferable to the reduced speed necessary to navigate horizontal curves around obstacles, or the higher construction costs necessary to tunnel through or bridge over them. In both these cases the experienced change in weight is less than 7%.

Rail well cars also risk low clearance at the tops of tight crests.

Problem curves 
 The Australian Standard Garratt had flangeless leading driving wheels that tended to cause derailments on sharp curves.
 Sharp curves on the Port Augusta to Hawker line of the South Australian Railways caused derailment problems when bigger and heavier X class locomotives were introduced, requiring realignments to ease the curves.
  curves on the Oberon, Batlow, and Dorrigo lines, New South Wales limited steam locomotives to the 0-6-0 19 class.

List of selected minimum curve radii

See also 

 Breakover angle
 :Category:Articulated locomotives
 Degree of curvature, civil engineering 
 Lateral motion device
 Longest trains
 Matheran Hill Railway
 Radius
 Radius of curvature (applications)
 Railway systems engineering
 Track transition curve
 Turning radius

References

External links 
 

Track geometry